Uttar Megh is a 1960 Bengali film directed by Jiban Ganguly. This is a drama film. This film was released on 12 January 1960. The film starring Supriya Choudhury, Utpal Dutt, Kamal Mitra and Uttam Kumar in the lead roles. This film production company by J.M.Pictures and distributed under the banner by National Movies.

Cast
 Supriya Choudhury
 Utpal Dutt
 Kamal Mitra
 Uttam Kumar
 Bidhayak Bhattacharya

References

External links
 

1960 films
Bengali-language Indian films
1960s Bengali-language films